Forcola is a comune (municipality) in the Province of Sondrio in the Italian region Lombardy, located about  northeast of Milan and about  west of Sondrio.

Forcola borders the following municipalities: Ardenno, Buglio in Monte, Colorina, Fusine, Talamona, Tartano, Sirta.

Demographic evolution

References

Cities and towns in Lombardy